Djamel Sedjati (also written Sejati)(جمال سجاتي), May 3, 1999, Tiaret) is an Algerian middle-distance runner specializing in the 800 meters. Unknown in Algeria, he came to prominence in 2021 after running a few meetings in Algeria. He finished second to Mohamed Ali Gouaned in 600 meters with a time of 1:17:40 during the Algerian Winter Championships held in Algiers on 26 March 2021. He also ran 1:45.99 in Batna meeting on 12 April 2021 defeating Mohamed Ali Gouaned, and finishing second behind Mohamed Belbachir in Algiers meeting on 7 May 2021 clocking a personal best of 1:45.86.

Sedjati later ran a few meetings in France and achieved qualification to the 2020 Summer Olympics in the 800 meters event after running a personal best of 1:44.91 in Strasbourg (France) on 16 June 2021. Sejati also ran as a pacemaker in later meetings helping compatriot Yassine Hethat reaching qualification to the 2020 Summer Olympics in the same event.

Sedjati is a member of training team of coach Amar Benida including 800 m compatriots Yassine Hethat and Mohamed Belbachir.

On arrival to Tokyo to participate in the Olympics men's 800 meters, Sedjati and compatriot Bilal Tabti were both tested positive to coronavirus on 24 July 2021 and were put into quarantine missing the Olympics event of men 800 m 

At the 2022 World Athletics Championships, Sedjati finished second in the 800m, clocking 1:44.14 winning the silver medal.

Personal bests
Outdoor

300 metres – 34.51 (Algiers, 27 March 2021)
600 metres – 1:15.03 (Bejaia, 4 March 2022)
800 metres – 1:43.69 (Strasbourg, 17 June 2022)

Indoor
800 metres – 1:46.28 (Sabadell (ESP), 8 February 2022)

References

1999 births
Living people
Algerian male middle-distance runners
21st-century Algerian people
Mediterranean Games gold medalists in athletics
Mediterranean Games gold medalists for Algeria
20th-century Algerian people